"Move Me No Mountain" is a song written by Jerry Ragovoy and Aaron Schroeder. It was originally recorded in 1974 by Love Unlimited, a group organized and produced by Barry White. In 1975, Ragovoy arranged and produced a recording of the song by American singer Dionne Warwick. Warwick's version used a slightly different melody in the song's chorus than the melody sung by Love Unlimited, and this variation has been used on subsequent recordings of the song. In 1980, American singer Chaka Khan recorded a version of the song with production by Arif Mardin.

Soul II Soul version

"Move Me No Mountain" was covered by British R&B band Soul II Soul and released in June 1992 as the second single from their third album, Volume III Just Right (1992). It features British singer Kofi (a.k.a. Carol Simms) and was a moderate hit in Europe. The song was a top 10 hit in Greece and Portugal, peaking at number seven and ten. In the UK, it reached number 31. Outside Europe, it peaked at number 29 on the Billboard Dance Club Songs chart in the US and was a top 40 hit in New Zealand. The accompanying black-and-white music video features Kofi performing the song behind or in front of a waterfall.

Critical reception
Larry Flick from Billboard complimented the "silky tones" of new vocalist Kofi, that empowers the song, "a hearty mix of the act's signature nouveau soul and state-of-the-charts house beats." John Martinucci from the Gavin Report declared it as a "laid back house-flavored track with Kofi's smooth vocals", adding that former Snap! member Penny Ford assists with the background vocals. A reviewer from Melody Maker opined that it's "all-too-slick" and the vocals delivered "sweetly but dispassionately". Andy Beevers from Music Week named it Pick of the Week in the category of Dance, viewing it as a "standout" of the album. He also complimented the song as "an obvious choice" featuring "sweet soulful vocals". 

Dele Fadele from New Musical Express wrote, "...you can still rely on them for well-tailored grooves and universal sentiments. With new discovery Kofi's warm, earthy voice jousting against a string arrangement, "Move Me No Mountain" makes a case for long, languid summers and the resurrection of "Soul"." Orla Swift from Record-Journal described it as "gospel-inflected", naming it one of the album's "strongest cuts". Miranda Sawyer from Select felt that it "skips along very nicely — sweet lovers' rock vocals (from reggae star Kofi) soaring over Soul II Soul's effortlessly clubby beat." Another editor, David Lubich, remarked that it shows "a glimpse of vocal talent". Tom Doyle from Smash Hits was less enthustiastic, giving the song two out of five.

Track listing
 12-inch single, UK (1992)
"Move Me No Mountain" (Club Mix)
"Move Me No Mountain" (Hackney E9 Mix) 
"Move Me No Mountain" (Dub)
"Move Me No Mountain" (Removed Club Mix)                  
"Move Me No Mountain" (Dum Dum Dub)

 CD single, UK (1992)
"Move Me No Mountain" (Album Edit) – 3:25
"Move Me No Mountain" (Club Mix) – 4:22
"Move Me No Mountain" (Radio Mix) – 2:56
"Move Me No Mountain" (Hackney E9 Mix) – 4:06                   
"Move Me No Mountain" (Dub) – 3:38
"Move Me No Mountain" (Removed Club Mix) – 6:23
"Move Me No Mountain" (Dum Dum Dub) – 5:18

Charts

References

1974 songs
1992 singles
Soul II Soul songs
Virgin Records singles
Dance-pop songs
Black-and-white music videos
Songs written by Aaron Schroeder
Songs written by Jerry Ragovoy